Anthony Wood may refer to:

 Anthony Wood (antiquary) (1632–1695),  English antiquary
 Anthony Wood (businessman) (born 1965), British-born American billionaire businessman
 Anthony Wood (historian) (1923–1987), British school teacher and historian
 Anthony Wood (artist) (1925–2022), British heraldic artist

See also 
 Tony Wood (disambiguation)
 Anthony Woods (born 1980), United States Army soldier discharged for violating the military's "Don't ask, don't tell" policy
 Tony Woods (disambiguation)